Lonestar Cell is a telecommunications company based in Monrovia, Liberia. The company owns and operates the largest wireless telecommunications network in Liberia, with 48% of the market share in 2011. Founded in 2000 by Beirut-based Investcom, the company became a subsidiary of the South African conglomerate MTN Group following MTN's acquisition of Investcom in 2006. Liberian businessman Benoni Urey is the Chair of Lonestar Communication Corporation and owns a significant portion of the company through his PLC Investments Group.

References 

Telecommunications companies of Liberia
Telecommunications companies established in 2000
Companies based in Monrovia